Elektro Kumbia is the debut studio album by Mexican-American cumbia group A.B. Quintanilla y Elektro Kumbia and the ninth studio album by Mexican-American musician A.B. Quintanilla. It was released on June 30, 2017 by DEL Records. The album was originally titled Kumbia Shots before being changed to Elektro Kumbia.

Track listing

References

2017 albums
Kumbia All Starz albums
A. B. Quintanilla albums
Albums produced by A.B. Quintanilla
Spanish-language albums
Cumbia albums
Albums recorded at Q-Productions